Christian Lars Nilsson (born 25 May 1979) is a  Swedish former professional golfer.

Professional career
Nilsson was born in Karlstad, Sweden. He turned professional in 1999 with a plus 3 handicap. Nilsson played on the Challenge Tour full-time since 2004, playing few events before then. His first event on the European Tour was the 2005 Open Championship where he missed the cut. His first full season on the European Tour was 2006, and his second in 2007. In 2008 he played on both the Challenge and European Tours with his best finish a runner-up to David Dixon at the Saint-Omer Open, but he did not break through until 2009 at the same event. At the 2009 Saint-Omer Open in June, a week opposite the U.S. Open, Nilsson won his first European Tour event by 6 strokes over Portugal's José-Filipe Lima. The win was Nilsson's first professional win on a recognized major golf tour.

After a disappointing season in 2012 where he finished 149th in the Race to Dubai, Nilsson announced that he would be retiring from professional golf to focus more on his family. He began working as an instructing professional at Karlstad Golf Club. 

In 2017 he came back to competitive golf, playing on the Nordic Golf League, the Swedish Golf Tour and the Swedish mini tour Future Series. In 2017 and 2018 he won four times on the Future Series in Sweden.

Professional wins (9)

European Tour wins (1)

1Dual-ranking event with the Challenge Tour

Challenge Tour wins (1)

1Dual-ranking event with the European Tour

Challenge Tour playoff record (0–1)

Nordic Golf League wins (3)

Other wins (5)
2000 Vattenfall Berga Open (Swedish Mini-Tour)
2017 Kumla Open by Malmbergs Elektriska AB, Bråviken Open, OVAKO Hagge Open (all Swedish minitour Future Series)
2018 Hårga Open (Swedish minitour Future Series)

Team appearances
Amateur
European Boys' Team Championship (representing Sweden): 1996, 1997
Jacques Léglise Trophy (representing the Continent of Europe): 1996 (winners)
European Youths' Team Championship (representing Sweden): 1998
Eisenhower Trophy (representing Sweden): 1998, 2002

See also
2005 European Tour Qualifying School graduates
2008 Challenge Tour graduates

References

External links

Swedish male golfers
European Tour golfers
Sportspeople from Karlstad
1979 births
Living people